Linnville may refer to:

Linnville, Ohio
Linnville, Brazoria County, Texas, see List of ghost towns in Texas
Linnville, Calhoun County, Texas

See also
Linville (disambiguation)